Ina Jang (born 1982, South Korea) is a photographer based out of Brooklyn, New York. She received her BFA in photography in 2010 from the School of the Visual Arts in New York City. In 2012, she completed the school's MPS program in fashion photography. Ina Jang is represented by Foley Gallery.

Photographs
In an interview with Unseen, Jang describes her approach to photography as "playful, light-hearted and dreamy." In the same interview, she describes how many of her photographs are inspired by ideas which began in the form of drawings. One sees this close connection between drawing and photography in her photographs' compositions, which emphasize the images' two-dimensionality. Ina's work was featured in The New Yorker in 2018.

Exhibitions

Solo exhibitions
2018

UTOPIA, Foley Gallery, New York, NY

2017
UTOPIA, Christophe Guye Galerie, Zurich (Switzerland) 
2011
SO, TOO & VERY, Curated by James Moffatt, Anagnorisis Fine Arts, NYC (USA)
2009
WORLD, School of Visual Arts, NYC (USA)
XOXO, Anagnorisis Fine Arts, NYC (USA)
2008
BY INA, School of Visual Arts, NYC (USA)

Group exhibitions
2013
THE YOUTH CODE!, Christophe Guye Galerie, Zurich (Switzerland)
2012
ICONS OF TOMORROW, Christophe Guye Galerie, Zurich (Switzerland)
FLASH FORWARD 2011, Magenta Foundation, Portland (Canada)
PHOTO ASSIGNMENT EXHIBITION, Festival International de Mode et de Photographie, Hyeres (France)
GIRLCORE, Orange Dot Gallery, London (UK)
2011
FLASH FORWARD 2011, Magenta Foundation, Portland (Canada)
FOAM TALENT 2011 Foam Fotografiemuseum Amsterdam, International Photography Magazine, Amsterdam (The Netherlands)
TOKYO PHOTO 2011, Danziger Gallery, Tokyo Midtown Hall, Tokyo (Japan)
GROUP EXHIBITION, Festival International de Mode et de Photographie, Hyeres (France)
New Visual Artists 2011, Print Magazine, NYC (USA)
2010
KiptonART RISING g 2011, KiptonART, NYC (USA)
FUTURE PERFECT, Curated by Stephen Frailey, KiptonART, NYC (USA)
MENTORS AT NEW YORK PHOTO FESTIVAL, NYPH’10, NYC (USA)
ANOTHER ART SHOW, Submergedart Gallery, Newark (USA)
MENTORS, Visual Arts Gallery, NYC (USA)
GROUP SHOW 34, Humble
iGavel Emering Artist Auction, Daniel Cooney Fine Art, Online
2009
BASICALLY HUMAN, Curated by Stephen Frailey, The Empty Quarter, Dubai (UAE); Visual Arts Gallery, NYC (USA)
SURFACE LIFE, Visual Arts Gallery, NYC (USA)
2008
OUR LADY  _ist Gallery, NYC (USA)

Awards
Jang was one of 15 artists from over 800 submissions selected to be featured in Foam's Issue #28/Talent. Additional awards and nominations include:

2013

 Foam Paul Huf Award from Foam Fotografiemuseum Amsterdam, Nominee

2012

 Foam Paul Huf Award from Foam Fotografiemuseum Amsterdam, Nominee

2011
PDN 30, Nominee
Foam Talent 2011
Flash Forward 2011, Winner
Festival d’Hyeres 2011, Finalist
20 Under 30 New Visual Artists
Foam Paul Huf Award, Nominee
2010
PDN 30, Nominee
KiptonART Rising 2011, Winner
Creativity 40th Annual Print, Platinum
Creativity International Awards
The Tierney Fellowship, Nominee

References

1982 births
Living people
School of Visual Arts alumni
South Korean photographers
South Korean expatriates in the United States
South Korean women photographers